

People
 Watanabe no Tsuna, a Japanese samurai

Fictional characters
 Tsunayoshi "Tsuna" Sawada, a character from the anime/manga Reborn! (Katekyo Hitman Reborn!)